Sizang or Sizang Chin may be,

Sizang people
Sizang language

Language and nationality disambiguation pages